Paul Yip Kwok-wah is founder and chairman of Hong Kong Policy Research Institute, chairman of B & P Foundation, honorary professor of Xi’an Jiaotong University, honorary professor of Graduate School of Chinese Academy of Social Sciences, as well as honorary professor of Shandong Youth University of Political Science.

In addition, Yip serves as board chairman of Hong Kong Chinese Culture Development Association Limited, member of the Election Committee of the National People's Congress of the Hong Kong Special Administrative Region of the People's Republic of China.

Yip participated in the 1980s in the specialised research es related to Hong Kong's return to China organised by Hong Kong and Macau Affairs Office, and was later appointed as Hong Kong Advisor of Central People's Government and Member of Preparatory Committee as well as Selection Committee of Hong Kong Special Administrative Region. Between July 1, 1997, and June 30, 2002, he served as Special Advisor to Chief Executive of Hong Kong Special Administrative Region, speicialising in political liaison with Taiwan and various sectors of Hong Kong. Yip also served the Hong Kong Basic Law Foundation as chairman up to December 2017.

As for his private business, Yip is chairman of B & P Holdings Limited, China Education Development (Invest & Mgt) Co. Ltd., Yew Wah International Education Foundation, Yew Wah Education Management Company Limited and Hong Kong Renful Group, as well as board director of Yew Chung Education Foundation in Hong Kong and member, of the Board of Governors of Yew Chung College of Early Childhood Education.

References 

Academic staff of Xi'an Jiaotong University
Hong Kong business executives
Year of birth missing (living people)
Living people